El dinosaurio (The dinosaur) is a flash fiction written by the Honduras-born Guatemalan writer Augusto Monterroso, published as a part of the book Obras completas (y otros cuentos), in 1959. It is considered one of the shortest stories in Spanish, and its whole text is the following:

Meaning: When he/she/it woke, the dinosaur was still there.

It is a simple sentence that forms a flash story, probably the most famous of all those published by Monterroso throughout his career. It was considered the shortest conte in the Spanish language until the publication of another three works during the 21st century: one in 2005, El emigrante, by Luis Felipe Lomelí; other, in 2006, Luis XIV, by Juan Pedro Aparicio, and one in 2015, Epitafio para un microrrelatista, by Marcelo Gobbo.

Impact in Mexican popular culture 
In the history of Mexico, the Institutional Revolutionary Party remained in power for more than seven decades. It was compared to a "Dinosaur" by commentators due to the length of its time in power; as such, the El dinosaurio poem was often used to mock them.

References

Bibliography 

  

Spanish short stories
1959 short stories